Dagenham Dock is a National Rail station in the Dagenham Dock neighbourhood of Dagenham in the London Borough of Barking and Dagenham, east London. The station was opened in 1908 by the London, Tilbury and Southend Railway. The station serves a primarily industrial area adjacent to the River Thames, including the Ford Dagenham site, that is now going through redevelopment as a commercial and residential district. Its three-letter station code is DDK and it is in London fare zone 5. The station and all trains serving it are currently operated by c2c. It is an interchange with the East London Transit bus service.

History
The station opened on 1 July 1908 on the original route of the London, Tilbury and Southend Railway, but was not one of the original stations.

On 18 December 1931, a freight train became divided at Dagenham Dock. Due to a signalman's error, a passenger train ran into the rear portion of the freight. Two people were killed and several were injured in the incident.

Design
The station consists of two side platforms with a small entrance building to the northern (down) platform. Within the station a footbridge connects the platforms. An accessible footbridge with stairs and lifts outside the station connects the northern entrance building with the East London Transit terminal to the south. The external footbridge also provides step-free lift access with the southern (up) platform.

High Speed 1 and some freight tracks run parallel, however these are not directly accessible from the platforms. The elevated A13 road runs above the eastern ends of the platform.

Location
The station is located on Chequers Lane in the Dagenham Dock neighbourhood. London Buses route 145 serves the northern side of the station. London Buses service EL2 operates from the East London Transit terminal to the south of the station.

Services
The typical off-peak service frequency is:

 2 trains per hour (tph) westbound to London Fenchurch Street;

During peak times there are additional trains with a service frequency of 4 tph, including some connecting to other sections of the line beyond Grays.

Redevelopment
Although the station is relatively poorly served and located in an industrial area, there are plans to redevelop the area as London Riverside. Under these plans the station has become the southern terminus of phase one of the East London Transit and it was proposed that an eastern extension of the Docklands Light Railway would terminate here. 

In October 2021 planning permission was given by Barking and Dagenham Council to Inland Homes for 380 new homes and a new public square to the north of the station.

In November 2022 Peabody was given planning permission for the first 935 of 3,500 homes in the Dagenham Green development on part of the former Ford Dagenham site to the northeast of the station.

The consolidated Dagenham Dock wholesale market is proposed for the southeast of the station on the former Barking Reach Power Station site.

Beam Park railway station is planned to be constructed as a new station to the east of Dagenham Dock.

Ripple Lane

Situated to the immediate west of the station, the Ripple Lane inter-modal freight depot was originally developed to supply parts from across Europe to the Ford Dagenham plant. Today it has become a base for various continental freight services.

In 2009 Stobart Rail commenced a new, weekly refrigerated train service, operated in conjunction with DB Schenker. The  from Valencia in Spain terminates at Ripple Lane, providing for an alternative to lorries for the import of fresh Spanish produce. The first fully refrigerated goods service to run through the Channel Tunnel, it is currently the longest train journey in Europe by a single operator. On the return journey to Spain, the train carries pallets for CHEP.

References

External links

 for Dagenham Dock railway station from National Rail

Docklands Light Railway stations in the London Borough of Barking and Dagenham
Railway stations in the London Borough of Barking and Dagenham
DfT Category E stations
Former London, Tilbury and Southend Railway stations
Railway stations in Great Britain opened in 1908
Railway stations served by c2c
1908 establishments in England